Quayside is a waterfront district slated for redevelopment in Toronto, Ontario, Canada. A smart city project was in the planning stages, proposed by Sidewalk Labs, a subsidiary of Alphabet Inc., named Sidewalk Toronto. Alphabet announced the cancellation of the project on May 7, 2020. Development of the site is now on hold.

Site
The area is bounded by Gardiner Expressway to the north, Bonnycastle Street to the west, Queen's Quay East (from Bonnycastle east up the eastern side of Parliament Street Slip) and east by Victory Soya Mills Silos. While the area east of the Parliament Slip is vacant other than berthing for Toronto Harbour Cruises ships, a number of low rise businesses reside along the north side of Queen's Quay East. The parcels of land included in the project are:

 Quayside Development Block
 Parliament Development Lands
 333 Lake Shore Boulevard East - former site of the  Sunsoy Products Limited linked with the Victory Soya Mills Silos and now parking lot since 1996.

Waterfront Toronto has estimated the value of the land alone at  million.

Sidewalk Toronto

The project began as a request for proposal by Waterfront Toronto in March 2017 and made official in October 2017. Sidewalk Labs committed  million and one year's worth of engagement to develop a plan for execution. The two partners formed a third entity, called "Sidewalk Toronto," devoted to bringing the lakeside property to life. The agreement did not give Sidewalk Labs the right to develop land or avoid government approvals.

The project would have encouraged the use of electric vehicles and an onsite power generation station using renewable energy was planned.

The project has also attracted significant controversy, particularly relating to the terms of the agreement and also privacy concerns. The contract between Sidewalk Labs and Waterfront Toronto has been shrouded in secrecy. Board members of Waterfront Toronto, a city, Ontario and federal partnership, had only four days to review the deal to work with Sidewalk Labs for a year on development plans — before signing. Toronto city councillor Denzil Minnan-Wong, the sole city representative on the Waterfront Toronto board, has called for the agreement to be made public beyond the four-page summary that is currently available, stating "I know enough about the agreement that I think you would like to know more about the agreement." He also made a failed motion to make public the Sidewalk Labs contract at a 2017 board meeting. Privacy concerns have also been brought up by numerous experts, who note the incentives for parent company Alphabet to collect personal data from residents and visitors. Sidewalk Labs CEO Dan Doctoroff stated in 2017 that while data sharing isn’t in Sidewalk Labs’s ethos, he couldn't say with definitive certainty what would happen with the information collected in Quayside since it wasn't clear then who would own the data.

On May 7, 2020, Dan Doctoroff, CEO of Sidewalk Labs, announced the Labs would drop plans to build in Toronto. He expressed personal regret, and said he had met thousands of Toronto residents excited by the idea, attributing the decision to economic uncertainty and real-estate fluctuations.

See also
 Port Lands
 Corktown
 Regent Park
 St. Lawrence Market
 Waterfront Trail

References

External links
 Quayside Official website

Neighbourhoods in Toronto
Redeveloped ports and waterfronts in Toronto
Planned developments
Waterfront Toronto